The Norwegian Handball Federation (NHF) is the national handball association in Norway.

The Norwegian Handball Federation was founded in 1937, and is a member of the Norwegian Olympic and Paralympic Committee and Confederation of Sports (NIF), the European Handball Federation (EHF) and the International Handball Federation. Its headquarters are in Oslo.

History
Former presidents of the federation include Carl E. Wang (president 1972–1977), Tor Lian (president 1985–1999), and Karl-Arne Johannessen (president 1999–2004 and 2009–2015). 

 has been president since 2015.

References

External links
  

Handball in Norway
Handball
Handball
Norway
1937 establishments in Norway
Organisations based in Oslo
Sports organizations established in 1937